Reliance damages is the measure of compensation given to a person who suffered an economic harm for acting in reliance on a party who failed to fulfill their obligation.

Scope
Reliance damages are valued by a party's reliance interest for the foreseeable amount. They put the injured party in the same money position as if the contract had never been formed.

Reliance interest is one of the three prongs of interest discussed by legal experts Lou Fuller and William Perdue in their 1936 article, "The Reliance Interest in Contract Damages." The other two interests are expectation interest and restitution interest.

Application
Under contract law, in a bilateral contract two or more parties owe obligations to each other.  Each party acts in reliance that the other party will fulfill their respective obligation.  If one party fails to respect their obligation, then the other party or parties may suffer an economic harm.  Reliance damages compensate the harmed party/ies for the amount of damages they suffered for acting in reliance on the other party's contractual obligations. They are most often rewarded when the aggrieved party's damages are not capable of accurate estimation and ordering Specific Performance would be inappropriate.

In US law, reliance damages are the type of damages awarded in promissory estoppel claims, although they can also be awarded in traditional contract breaches. This is appropriate because even if there is no bargain principle in the agreement, one party has relied on a promise and thus is damaged to the extent of their reliance. These damages must be proven with reasonable certainty. It is not enough that one party simply guess as to how much they are actually damaged.

In a losing contract, reliance damages will be reduced because the aggrieved party cannot be put in a better position had the contract been performed. Here, the losses from the contract will be subtracted from the reliance damages.

Example

Neal and Matt formed a bilateral contract.  Neal spent $100 in reliance on the contract, which was foreseeable.  However, Matt breached the contract.

Reliance damages protect a party's reliance interest.  Neal spent $100 in reliance on the contract, which constituted Neal's reliance interest.

Since reliance damages equal to the value of the reliance interest of the injured party, Matt owes Neal $100.  This puts Neal in the same economic position as if the contract never happened.

See also
Damages
Expectation damages
Restitution

References

Contract law
Judicial remedies